Girls Can't Swim is a 2000 French coming of age drama film. The film had its world premiere at the 2000 Montreal World Film Festival and was released in France on 18 October of that year. It was given a limited theatrical release in the United States on 19 April 2002.

Plot
Gwen is a teenager living in a coastal town in Brittany; Lise is her city-living best friend. They meet up each summer as Lise's family visits. This year's visit is different though - Lise is dealing with her distant father's death, and Gwen has become promiscuous with boys, which threatens to affect the girls' friendship.

Cast
 Isild Le Besco as Gwen
 Karen Alyx as Lise
 Pascale Bussières as Céline
 Pascal Elso as Alain
 Marie Rivière as Anne-Marie
 Yelda Reynaud as Solange
 Sandrine Blancke as Vivianne
 Julien Cottereau as Frédo
 Dominique Lacarrière as Rose

Reception
Stephen Holden of the New York Times said "Girls Can't Swim ultimately lacks the epic dimension of Y Tu Mamá También, but its vision of that awkward age when sex threatens to overwhelm everything else is acute enough to make everyone who has been there squirm with recognition."

Leslie Camhi of The Village Voice gave a positive review, writing “[Birot’s] film falters when it takes a final, violent turn into melodrama. Until then, though, she captures the deep currents of love and rivalry that make female teen friendships so important and so volatile.”

Jamie Russell of the BBC reviewed the film positively, stating “Sexual politics aside, what makes 'Girls Can't Swim' so involving is debut filmmaker Anne Sophie-Birot's nicely observed script, which treats its adolescent heroines with a wonderful amount of compassion.”

Paula Nechak of the Seattle Post-Intelligencer said, “Birot delves into subtexts on the principles of transference: the Oedipal attachments to their fathers that the girls renounce in order to gain other love objects. Her exploration of these psychological tenets in the context of modern teen behavior makes for darkly compelling and fresh viewing.”

On the other hand, Charles Taylor of Salon gave a negative review, writing, “Everything about 'Girls Can't Swim,’ even its passages of sensitive observation, feels secondhand, familiar—and not in a good way.” Roger Ebert gave the film two stars, saying "The phrase ‘coming of age,' when applied to movies, almost always implies sex, but Girls Can't Swim has nothing useful to say about sex (certainly not compared to Catherine Breillat's brilliant Fat Girl from last year), and is too jerky in structure to inspire much empathy from us."

The film has a 71% approval based on 34 reviews on review aggregator website Rotten Tomatoes.

References

External links

Girls Can’t Swim at Rotten Tomatoes
Girls Can’t Swim at Celluloid Dreams

2000 films
2000 drama films
2000 LGBT-related films
French LGBT-related films
Lesbian-related films
LGBT-related drama films
2000 directorial debut films
French coming-of-age drama films
2000s coming-of-age drama films
Juvenile sexuality in films
Films set in Brittany
Films set on beaches
2000s French films